Valeri Sorokin may refer to:

 Valeri Sorokin (footballer, born 1987), Russian footballer
 Valeri Yevgenyevich Sorokin (b. 1985), Russian footballer